Håkon Grønsveen Olsrud (born 11 April 1985) is a Norwegian Paralympic cross-country skier. He has competed at the Winter Paralympics in 2014 and in 2018. Håkon Olsrud claimed his first Paralympic medal, a bronze medal in the men's 20km free standing cross-country skiing event during the 2018 Winter Paralympics.

References

External links 
 

1985 births
Living people
Norwegian male cross-country skiers
Cross-country skiers at the 2014 Winter Paralympics
Cross-country skiers at the 2018 Winter Paralympics
Paralympic cross-country skiers of Norway
Paralympic silver medalists for Norway
Paralympic bronze medalists for Norway
Medalists at the 2018 Winter Paralympics
Paralympic medalists in cross-country skiing